Total Divas is an American reality television series that premiered on July 28, 2013, on E!. The series gave viewers an inside look of the lives of WWE Divas from their work within WWE to their personal lives. Behind the scene footage of the Divas is also included.

Production
The series gives viewers an inside look of the lives of WWE Divas from their work within WWE to their personal lives. Behind the scene footage of the Divas is also included. On May 19, 2014, E! announced that the third season of Total Divas will premiere on September 7, 2014, with Rosa Mendes joining the cast. Unlike other WWE programs, most of the performers use their real names instead of their ring names, leading to Cameron, Naomi, Natalya, Jimmy Uso, and Tyson Kidd being referred to as Ariane, Trinity, Nattie, Jon, and TJ respectively.

Cast

Main cast
 Brie Bella (Brianna Danielson)
 Cameron (Ariane Andrew)
 Eva Marie (Natalie Marie Coyle)
 Naomi (Trinity Fatu)
 Natalya (Natalie Neidhart-Wilson)
 Nikki Bella (Stephanie Garcia-Colace)
 Summer Rae (Danielle Moinet)
 Rosa Mendes (Milena Roucka)
 Alicia Fox (Victoria Crawford)
 Paige (Saraya-Jade Bevis)

Recurring cast
 Daniel Bryan (Brie's husband)
 Vincent Isayan (Cameron's boyfriend)
 Jonathan Coyle (Eva Marie's husband)
 Tyson Kidd (Natalya's husband)
 John Cena (Nikki's fiancé)
 Mark Carrano (WWE Senior Director of Talent Relations)
 Kathy Colace (Brie & Nikki's mother)
 J.J. Garcia (Brie & Nikki's brother)

Guest stars
 JoJo (Joseann Offerman)
 Big E (Ettore Ewen)
 Dolph Ziggler (Nicholas "Nick" Nemeth)
 Emma (Tenille Dashwood)
 Jimmy Uso (Naomi's husband)
 Sandra Gray (WWE's seamstress)
 Jim Neidhart (Nattie's father)
 Ellie Neidhart (Nattie's mother)

Episodes

Ratings

References

External links

 
 

2014 American television seasons
2015 American television seasons
Total Divas